9950 ESA, provisional designation , is an eccentric asteroid and elongated near-Earth object of the Amor group, approximately 1.7 kilometers in diameter. It was discovered on 8 November 1990, by French astronomer Christian Pollas at the Centre de recherches en géodynamique et astrométrie (Cerga) at Caussols in southeastern France. It was named for the European Space Agency (ESA).

Orbit and classification 

ESA is an Amor asteroid – a subgroup of near-Earth asteroids that approach the orbit of Earth from beyond, but do not cross it. It orbits the Sun at a distance of 1.1–3.7 AU once every 3 years and 10 months (1,390 days). Its orbit has an eccentricity of 0.53 and an inclination of 15° with respect to the ecliptic. The body's observation arc begins with its official discovery observation at Caussols in November 1990.

Close approaches 

It approached the Earth at 0.393 AU on 18 October 1990, three weeks prior to its discovery, and made two more close approaches in August and September 2013, respectively.

The eccentric asteroid is also a Mars-crosser.

Physical characteristics 

ESA is an assumed stony S-type asteroid.

Rotation period 

In 2013, three rotational lightcurves of ESA were obtained from photometric observations by the EURONEAR Lightcurve Survey and by American astronomers Brian Warner and Robert Stephens at the Center for Solar System Studies. Lightcurve analysis gave a rotation period between 6.707 and 6.712 hours with a brightness variation of 0.44 to 0.89 magnitude. A high brightness amplitude typically indicates that the body's shape is irregular and elongated, rather than spherical.

Diameter and albedo 

In the early 1990s, David Tholen at the Institute for Astronomy of the University of Hawaii estimated a diameter of 3 kilometers for ESA. The Collaborative Asteroid Lightcurve Link assumes a standard albedo for stony asteroids of 0.20 and calculates a diameter of 1.71 kilometers based on an absolute magnitude of 16.2.

Naming 

This minor planet was named after the European Space Agency (ESA), which formed in 1974. The name was suggested by French astronomer Jean Louis Heudier, after whom the asteroid 4602 Heudier was named. The official naming citation was published by the Minor Planet Center on 15 December 2005.

Notes

References

External links 
 Asteroid Lightcurve Database (LCDB), query form (info )
 Dictionary of Minor Planet Names, Google books
 Asteroids and comets rotation curves, CdR – Observatoire de Genève, Raoul Behrend
 
 
 

009950
Discoveries by Christian Pollas
Named minor planets
19901108